Ágúst Herbert Guðmundsson (26 August 1967 – 1 January 2021) was an Icelandic basketball coach and player.

Early life
Ágúst was born in Patreksfjörður, Iceland but moved at a young age to Hafnarfjörður where he started playing basketball with Haukar's junior teams. He later moved to Akureyri and played several seasons with Þór Akureyri.

Coaching career
Ágúst was the head coach of Þór Akureyri from 1998 to 2001. He continued to coach the club's junior teams until 2017.

Death
In 2017, Ágúst was diagnosed with Motor neuron disease. He died from the illness on 1 January 2021.

Personal life
Ágúst was married to Guðrún Gísladóttir with whom he had three children, including basketball player Júlíus Orri Ágústsson.

References

External links
Úrvalsdeild karla statistics Icelandic Basketball Association

1967 births
2021 deaths
Agust Gudmundsson
Agust Gudmundsson
Agust Gudmundsson
Agust Gudmundsson
Agust Gudmundsson
Agust Gudmundsson
Agust Gudmundsson
People from Patreksfjörður